Chrysanthenone  (C10H14O) is a terpenoid. It can be produced from its isomer verbenone in a photochemical rearrangement reaction.

References

External links
Kovats - chrysanthenone

Ketones
Monoterpenes
Cycloalkenes
Cyclobutanes